Daniel Piorkowski (born 12 January 1984) is an Australian footballer.

Club career

Melbourne Knights
His progress as a footballer was delayed by a knee reconstruction, sustained during his playing days with ex NSL club Melbourne Knights FC. Daniel also was a member of the Australian Under 20 Side and missed out on a place in the Under-20 World Cup due to a knee reconstruction.

Melbourne Victory
After signing for Melbourne Victory, Piorkowski made 11 appearances and was signed to a new two-year deal in April 2006. Piorkowski was an important part of the Victory defence during their premiership winning season in 06/07 along with Adrian Leijer and Rodrigo Vargas. He unfortunately injured his knee during the season and did not feature in the finals series. On 13 February 2008 he was tabled a new contract by Victory but remained undecided whether to stay with the club. On 13 May 2008 he finally decided to pursue his ambitions of playing in Europe.

Newcastle Jets
On 13 September 2008 he signed a short deal after a week-long trial to cover injured defender Shaun Ontong.

Gold Coast United
On 20 November 2008 he joined Gold Coast United FC on a two-year deal.

Honours
Melbourne Victory
 A-League Championship: 2006-2007
 A-League Premiership: 2006-2007

References

External links
 Gold Coast United profile
 Oz Football profile

1984 births
Living people
Soccer players from Melbourne
Association football defenders
A-League Men players
National Soccer League (Australia) players
Gold Coast United FC players
Melbourne Knights FC players
Melbourne Victory FC players
Newcastle Jets FC players
Walsall F.C. players
Whittlesea Zebras players
Australian people of Polish descent
Australian soccer players
Australia under-20 international soccer players